Diedhiou or Diédhiou may refer to:

Amath Diedhiou
Amath Ndiaye Diedhiou
Bineta Diedhiou
Christophe Diedhiou
Famara Diedhiou
Hortense Diédhiou
Ibrahima Diédhiou
Malang Diedhiou
Simon Diedhiou